The side-striped chameleon or the two-lined chameleon (Trioceros bitaeniatus) is a chameleon native to Ethiopia, southern Sudan, Somalia, Kenya, Tanzania, Uganda, and the northeastern Democratic Republic of the Congo.

In Kenya, the side-striped chameleon lives on Mount Kenya, Kilimanjaro, and in the Aberdare Range. They live in the Hagenia and Hypericum scrub in the timberline forest between 3000 and 4000 m. They are strictly diurnal and shelter at night between dense bushes.

References

Trioceros
Reptiles of Kenya
Lizards of Africa
Reptiles described in 1884
Taxa named by Gustav Fischer